The 2021 Patriot League men's soccer tournament was the postseason men's soccer tournament for the Patriot League held from November 6 through November 13, 2021. The tournament was held at campus sites, with the higher seeded team hosting. The six-team single-elimination tournament consisted of three rounds based on seeding from regular season conference play. The defending champions were the American Eagles. They were unable to defend their crown, after losing to Loyola (MD) in the Final. The conference championship was the first for the Loyla men's soccer program, and the first for head coach Steve Nichols.  As tournament champions, Loyola earned the Patriot League's automatic berth into the 2021 NCAA Division I men's soccer tournament.

Seeding 

Six of the ten Patriot League men's soccer programs qualified for the 2021 Tournament. Teams were seeded based on their regular season records. Tiebreakers were used to determine the seedings of teams who finished with identical conference records.  A tiebreaker was required to determine the fourth and fifth seeds for the tournament as Lehigh and Navy finished with identical 5–4–0 records.  Lehigh earned the fourth seed by virtue of their 3–2 overtime victory over Navy on October 23.  Navy was the fifth seed for the tournament.

Bracket

Schedule

Quarterfinals

Semifinals

Final

Statistics

Goalscorers

All-Tournament team

Source:

MVP in bold

References 

 
Patriot League Men's Soccer Tournament